WSMT (1050 AM, "Solid Gospel AM 1050") is a radio station broadcasting a Southern Gospel music format. Licensed to Sparta, Tennessee, United States, the station serves the Cookeville area. The station is currently owned by Peg Broadcasting, LLC and features programming from Salem Radio Network.

References

External links
 

Southern Gospel radio stations in the United States
White County, Tennessee
Radio stations established in 1983
SMT